Raphitoma raynevali is an extinct species of sea snail, a marine gastropod mollusc in the family Raphitomidae.

Description
The length of the shell reaches 9.5 mm, its diameter 5.5 mm.

Distribution
Fossils of this extinct marine species were found in Pliocene strata in Italy

References

External links
 Bellardi L. (1877), I molluschi dei terreni terziarii del Piemonte e della Liguria /

erinaceus
Gastropods described in 1877